USA-196, also known as GPS IIR-17(M), GPS IIRM-4 and GPS SVN-55, is an American navigation satellite which forms part of the Global Positioning System. It was the fourth of eight Block IIRM satellites to be launched, and the seventeenth of twenty one Block IIR satellites overall. It was built by Lockheed Martin, using the AS-4000 satellite bus.

USA-196 was launched at 12:23:00 UTC on 17 October 2007, atop a Delta II carrier rocket, flight number D328, flying in the 7925-9.5 configuration. The launch took place from Space Launch Complex 17A at the Cape Canaveral Air Force Station, and placed USA-196 into a transfer orbit. The satellite raised itself into medium Earth orbit using a Star-37FM apogee motor.

It is used to broadcast the PRN 15 signal, and operates in slot 2 of plane F of the GPS constellation. As of 2015 it remains in service.

References

Spacecraft launched in 2007
GPS satellites
USA satellites